Trop jolies pour être honnêtes (Too Pretty to Be Honest), or 4 Souris pour un hold-up (Four Mice for a Holdup, subtitled by the English VHS as "Four Chicks for a Holdup") is a 1972 French film directed by Richard Balducci. In 1985 International Home Video Corp. of Wilmington, Los Angeles, California released an English subtitled version of the film, under the series La Vidéo Française.

In the film four female roommates who live in the French Riviera, Bernadette (Bernadette Lafont), Christine (Jane Birkin), Frédérique (Elisabeth Wiener), and Martine (Emma Cohen), discover that a group of thieves who committed a robbery are keeping their stolen goods in the building across from them. The women decide to steal the goods from the men.

Cast
 Jane Birkin
 Emma Cohen
 Serge Gainsbourg
 Carlo Guiffre
 Bernadette Lafont
 Elisabeth Wiener

References

External links

 

French comedy films
1972 films
Films scored by Serge Gainsbourg
1970s French films